T-ara is a four-member South Korean girl group formed by Core Contents Media in 2009. Their debut studio album Absolute First Album (2009) included the hit singles "TTL (Time to Love)" and "Bo Peep Bo Peep". "Bo Peep Bo Peep" earned the group their first music show win on KBS's Music Bank. It was later awarded Triple Crown on SBS's Inkigayo and was nominated for Best Dance Performance by a Female Group at the 12th Mnet Asian Music Awards. The album was re-released as Breaking Heart in 2010 and included two further singles, "I Go Crazy Because of You" and "I'm Really Hurt". "I Go Crazy Because of You" claimed two consecutive wins on Inkigayo and one on Mnet's M Countdown. The repackage album was nominated for both a Disk Bonsang and Popularity Award at the 25th Golden Disk Awards. Temptastic (2010) was released later that year and included the singles "Wae Ireoni" and "yayaya" both receiving wins on M Countdown.

The group's second extended play John Travolta Wannabe (2011) had the lead single "Roly-Poly" which became the top grossing and most downloaded song of 2011 in South Korea. The video for "Roly-Poly" was awarded Best Music Video at the 3rd Melon Music Awards and the song was later nominated for Song of the Year and Best Dance Performance by a Female Group at the Mnet Asian Music Awards. Their 2011 release, Black Eyes, included "Cry Cry" which became their first number-one song on Billboard Korea K-pop Hot 100, charting at the #1 position for two weeks.


Awards and nominations

Other accolades

Other recognitions

Rankings

References 

Awards
T-ara